Salem Center may refer to:

Salem Center, Indiana, an unincorporated community
Salem Center, Ohio, an unincorporated community
Salem Center (Oregon), a shopping mall in Salem, Oregon.
A hamlet within North Salem, New York.
A fictional location in the X-Men universe.